was a feudal domain under the Tokugawa shogunate of Edo period Japan, located in Tango Province in what is now the northern portion of modern-day Kyoto Prefecture. It was centered around the Mineyama jin'ya which was located in what is now the city of Kyōtango and was controlled by a cadet branch tozama daimyō Kyōgoku clan throughout all of its history.

History
Following the Battle of Sekigahara, Kyōgoku Takatomo was awarded the entire province of Tango and established Miyazu Domain. His grandson, Kyōgoku Takamichi received a 3000 koku hatamoto holding from Shogun Tokugawa Hidetada in 1616 and inherited the Mineyama region with a kokudaka of 10,000 koku from his grandfather in 1623. Miyazu Domain was abolished by attainder in 1666 and its cadet house at Tango-Tanabe Domain was transferred to Toyooka Domain in 1668, leaving only the minor Mineyama Domain in Kyōgoku hands in the province they once governed. 

During the tenure of the 5th daimyō, Kyōgoku Takanaga, the technique of producing a type of crepe cloth known as Tango chirimen was introduced from Nishijin in Kyoto, with the fabric soon becoming a local specialty and major source of income for the domain. 

The 6th daimyō, Kyōgoku Takahisa, served as a wakadoshiyori in the Shogunal administration, and was a major supporting character in the novel Onihei Hankachō by Ikenami Shōtarō. The 11th daimyō, Kyōgoku Takatomi also served as a wakadoshiyori, and with his adopted son and final daimyō Kyōgoku Takanobu was an early supporter of the Meiji restoration during the Boshin War. The clan was ennobled with the kazoku peerage title of shishaku (viscount). 

On the site of the former jin’ya of the domain is a large enoki tree (Celtis sinensis var.japonica), with a trunk circumference of 4.43 meters and height of 15 meters. The tree is estimated to be 250 to 300 years old, so it was planted around the time the jin’ya was first constructed. This tree is a Kyōtango City Natural Monument

Holdings at the end of the Edo period
As with most domains in the han system, Mineyama Domain consisted of several discontinuous territories calculated to provide the assigned kokudaka, based on periodic cadastral surveys and projected agricultural yields. 

Tango Province 
19 villages in Naka District
Kōzuke Province
2 villages in Yamada District
Hitachi Province
3 villages in Makabe District
Shimōsa Province
3 villages in Sashima District
Ōmi Province
1 village in Gamō District

List of daimyō 

{| class=wikitable
! #||Name || Tenure || Courtesy title || Court Rank || kokudaka 
|-
|colspan=6|  Kyōgoku clan, 1622-1871 (Tozama)
|-
||1||||1622 - 1666||Shuzen-no-kami (主膳正)|| Junior 5th Rank, Lower Grade (従五位下)||13,000 koku
|-
||2||||1666 - 1674||Shuzen-no-kami (主膳正)|| Junior 5th Rank, Lower Grade (従五位下)||13,000 koku
|-
||3||||1674 - 1699||Shuzen-no-kami (主膳正)|| Junior 5th Rank, Lower Grade (従五位下)||13,000 koku
|-
||4||||1699 - 1723||Shuzen-no-kami (主膳正)|| Junior 5th Rank, Lower Grade (従五位下)||13,000 koku
|-
||5||||1723 - 1765||Shuzen-no-kami (主膳正)|| Junior 5th Rank, Lower Grade (従五位下)||13,000 koku
|-
||6||||1765 - 1808||Bizen-no-kami (備前守)|| Junior 5th Rank, Lower Grade (従五位下)||13,000 koku
|-
||7||||1808 - 1832||Suo-no-kami (周防守)|| Junior 5th Rank, Lower Grade (従五位下)||13,000 koku
|-
||8||||1832 - 1833||Bizen-no-kami (備前守)|| Junior 5th Rank, Lower Grade (従五位下)||13,000 koku
|-
||9||||1834 - 1834||-none-||-none-||13,000 koku
|-
||10||||1834 - 1849||Ukon-no-jogan (右近将監)|| Junior 5th Rank, Lower Grade (従五位下)||13,000 koku
|-
||11||||1849 - 1868||Shuzen-no-kami (主膳正)|| Junior 5th Rank, Lower Grade (従五位下)||13,000 koku
|-
||12||||1868 - 1871||Bitchu-no-kami (備中守)|| Junior 5th Rank, Lower Grade (従五位下)||13,000 koku
|-
|}

See also 
 List of Han
 Abolition of the han system

Further reading
 Bolitho, Harold. (1974). Treasures Among Men: The Fudai Daimyo in Tokugawa Japan. New Haven: Yale University Press.  ;  OCLC 185685588

References

Domains of Japan
1622 establishments in Japan
States and territories established in 1622
1871 disestablishments in Japan
States and territories disestablished in 1871
Tango Province
History of Kyoto Prefecture